Neko Richelle Case (born September 8, 1970) is an American singer-songwriter and member of the Canadian indie rock group the New Pornographers. Case has a powerful, untrained contralto voice, which has been described by contemporaries and critics as a "flamethrower," "a powerhouse [which] seems like it might level buildings," "a 120-mph fastball," and a "vocal tornado".  Critics also note her idiosyncratic, "cryptic," "imagistic" lyrics, and credit her as a significant figure in the early 21st-century American revival of the tenor guitar. Case's body of work has spanned and drawn on a range of traditions including country, folk, art rock, indie rock, and pop and is frequently described as defying or avoiding easy generic classification.

Early life
Born in Alexandria, Virginia, Case is the daughter of James Bamford Case and Diana Mary Dubbs. Case's paternal family surname was originally Shevchenko; her great-aunt was the professional wrestler Ella Waldek. Her father, a Vietnam veteran serving in the United States Air Force, was based in Virginia at the time of her birth. Case's parents, who were teenagers when they had her, are of Ukrainian ancestry. Her parents divorced when Case began school.

Case's family relocated several times during her childhood due to her stepfather's work as an archaeologist. She has lived in Western Massachusetts, Vermont, Oregon and Washington. She considers Tacoma, Washington to be her hometown.

Case left home at age 15. By the age of 18 she was performing as a drummer for the Del Logs and the Propanes, playing in venues including a punk club called the Community World Theater.

Music career

Vancouver
In 1994, Case moved to Vancouver, British Columbia, to attend the Emily Carr Institute of Art and Design. While attending, she played drums in several local bands, including the Del Logs, the Propanes, the Weasels, Cub, and Maow. These bands  were, for the most part, local punk groups. Case said of the vibrant Vancouver punk rock scene at that time, "A lot of women wanted to play music because they were inspired, because it was an incredibly good time for music in the Northwest. There was a lot of clubs, a lot of bands, a lot of people coming through, a lot of all-ages stuff—it was a very exciting time to live there."

In 1998, Case left without finishing her Bachelor of Fine Arts degree, which meant the loss of her student visa eligibility. She left Canada for Seattle, Washington. Before going, Case recorded vocals for a few songs that ended up on Mass Romantic, the New Pornographers' first album. Her lead vocals on songs like "Letter from an Occupant" are straightforward, full-volume power-pop performances,  shedding any country elements. Released on November 28, 2000, Mass Romantic became a surprise success. Although the band was originally conceived as a side project for its members, the New Pornographers remain a prominent presence in the indie rock world, having released its eighth album In the Morse Code of Brake Lights on September 27, 2019.

In addition to recording with the New Pornographers, Case frequently collaborates with other Canadian musicians, including the Sadies and Carolyn Mark, and has recorded material by several noted Canadian songwriters, in particular on her 2001 EP Canadian Amp. As a result, she is also considered a significant figure in Canadian music—both CBC Radio 3 and the Society of Composers, Authors and Music Publishers of Canada have referred to Case as an "honourary Canadian". In 2018 Case performed at the Vancouver Folk Music Festival.

Seattle
Case embraced country music on her 1997 album, The Virginian. The album contained original compositions as well as covers of songs by Ernest Tubb, Loretta Lynn and the 1974 Queen song "Misfire". When the album was released, critics compared Case to honky-tonk singers like Lynn and Patsy Cline, and to rockabilly pioneer Wanda Jackson, particularly in her vocal timbre.

On February 22, 2000, Case released her second solo album, Furnace Room Lullaby. The album introduced the "country noir" elements that have defined Case's subsequent solo career. That tone was evident even from the cover photo, featuring Case sprawled out corpse-like on a concrete floor. On the album itself, her vocal style moves away from outright honky-tonk but retains her twang, garnering comparisons to musicians such as Cline, Lynn, Hazel Dickens, Tanya Tucker, and Dolly Parton. The title track was included on the soundtrack to Sam Raimi's film The Gift, and "Porchlight" was featured on the soundtrack to The Slaughter Rule.

Case sometimes tours with Canadian singer and songwriter Carolyn Mark as the Corn Sisters. One of their performances, at Seattle's Hattie's Hat restaurant in Ballard, was recorded and released as an album, The Other Women, on November 28, 2000.

Chicago
In October 1999, around the time Furnace Room Lullaby was released, Case left Seattle for Chicago because she felt that Seattle was no longer hospitable to its local artists.

Case's first work in Chicago was an eight-song EP that she recorded in her kitchen. Canadian Amp, her first recording without Her Boyfriends, was released on her own Lady Pilot label in 2001. She wrote two of the tracks, with the remaining six being covers, including Neil Young's "Dreaming Man" and Hank Williams' "Alone and Forsaken". Four of the covers were written by Canadian artists. The EP was initially available only at Case's live shows and directly from Mint Records' website, but it eventually saw wider release.

Case also recorded her third full-length album, Blacklisted, while living in Chicago.

In April 2003, Case was voted the "Sexiest Babe of Indie Rock" in a Playboy.com internet poll, receiving 32% of the vote. Playboy asked her to pose nude for the magazine, but she declined their offer. She told Entertainment Weekly that

I didn't want to be the girl who posed in Playboy and then—by the way—made some music. I would be really fucking irritated if after a show somebody came up to me and handed me some naked picture of myself and wanted me to sign it instead of my CD.

In later interviews, she declined to discuss the survey at all.

Neko Case & Her Boyfriends
Case recorded and toured for several years as Neko Case & Her Boyfriends before performing solely under her name. She primarily performed her own material, but also performed and recorded cover versions of songs by artists such as My Morning Jacket, Harry Nilsson, Loretta Lynn, Tom Waits, Nick Lowe, Buffy Sainte-Marie, Scott Walker, Randy Newman, Queen, Bob Dylan, Neil Young, Sparks and Hank Williams.  
Albums released included The Virginian and Furnace Room Lullaby.

New Pornographers
The New Pornographers' second album, Electric Version, was released on May 6, 2003. Case sang lead on even more of the songs on this album, and toured with the group again.

Twin Cinema, the New Pornographers' third album, was released on August 23, 2005, with Case again providing vocals on several tracks. In addition to providing backing vocals on several songs, Case performs lead vocals on two ballads, "The Bones of an Idol" and "These Are the Fables". She opted out of most subsequent touring duties with the band; however, her parts were taken over by Kathryn Calder.

On Challengers, released on August 21, 2007, Case contributes lead vocals to the title song as well as "Go Places", in addition to her backing vocals on the other tracks.

The 2010 album Together features Case as lead vocalist on "Crash Years" and "My Shepherd."

The 2014 album Brill Bruisers features Case as lead vocalist on "Champions of Red Wine" and "Marching Orders."

The 2017 album Whiteout Conditions features Case as lead vocalist on "Play Money" and "This is the World of the Theater."

case/lang/veirs

In 2016, Neko Case, k.d. lang, and Laura Veirs announced the case/lang/veirs project, with an album released in June 2016.

Solo

Blacklisted
Case recorded her third full-length album, Blacklisted, in Tucson, Arizona. It was the first full-length album credited to Case alone, without Her Boyfriends, and was released on Bloodshot Records on August 20, 2002. Some believe the title Blacklisted alludes to Case being banned for life from the Grand Ole Opry because she took her shirt off during a performance on August 4, 2001, at one of their outdoors "Opry Plaza" concerts, though Case herself has denied this. Asked about the incident in 2004, Case said "I had heatstroke. People would love it to be a 'fuck you' punk thing. But it was actually a physical ailment thing."

Most of the album's fourteen songs are originals; the exceptions being covers of "Running Out of Fools", previously a hit for Aretha Franklin, and "Look for Me (I'll Be Around)" previously performed by Sarah Vaughan. Blacklisted finds Case even deeper in a "country noir" mood, and was described by critics as lush, bleak, and atmospheric. Case cited filmmaker David Lynch, composer Angelo Badalamenti, and Neil Young's soundtrack to the film Dead Man as influences.

Live from Austin, TX
2003's Live from Austin, TX was an album of live recordings made for the "Austin City Limits" television series.

The Tigers Have Spoken 
In April 2004, Case played several shows with longtime collaborators the Sadies in Chicago and Toronto. These shows were recorded and released as a live album, The Tigers Have Spoken, by Anti Records in October 2004.

Fox Confessor Brings the Flood
Fox Confessor Brings the Flood was released on March 7, 2006. The album was recorded primarily in Tucson, over the course of two years as Case worked on the live The Tigers Have Spoken and continued to play with the New Pornographers. Critics hailed the record not only for Case's trademark vocals but also her use of stark imagery and non-standard song structures. Fox Confessor Brings the Flood wound up on many "Best of 2006" lists, such as No.1 on the Amazon.com music editors' picks and No. 2 on NPR's All Songs Considered. The album debuted at No. 54 on the Billboard 200 albums chart. It contains Case's most autobiographical song, "Hold On, Hold On". Case said: "the song is actually about me. It's not metaphorical about other people. It's not little pieces of my life made into a story about someone else or someone fictitious."

"Hold On, Hold On" has since been covered by Marianne Faithfull on her 2009 album Easy Come, Easy Go.

"Hold On, Hold On" was used over an episode of The Killing (Season 1 Episode 6) before the final credits.

"Hold On, Hold On" was used in the 2015 drama film One More Time.

"John Saw That Number" was used in the snowboarding movie "City. Park City".

Middle Cyclone
Case's next album, Middle Cyclone, was released on March 3, 2009. In advance of a U.S. and European tour, Case appeared as a musical guest on The Tonight Show with Jay Leno. Later in 2009 she also appeared on Late Show with David Letterman, The Tonight Show with Conan O'Brien and Late Night with Jimmy Fallon. Amazon.com rated Middle Cyclone the number one album of 2009. Middle Cyclone debuted at No. 3 on the Billboard charts in its first week of release, making it Case's first album ever to reach the top ten in the United States.

At the time of its release, no other record from an independent record company had debuted at a higher position in 2009. She toured extensively to promote Middle Cyclone with dates in North America, Europe, and Australia, as well as a performance at Lollapalooza 2009 in Grant Park, Chicago.

The Worse Things Get, the Harder I Fight, the Harder I Fight, the More I Love You
In June 2013, Case announced a new album, The Worse Things Get, the Harder I Fight, the Harder I Fight, the More I Love You, which was released on September 3.

Hell-On
In early March, 2018, Case released a teaser for an album titled Hell-On, her first solo work in almost five years. The teaser featured Case lying down singing a song of the same name while snakes move around her.  The album was released on June 1, 2018.

Truckdriver, Gladiator, Mule
On November 13, 2015, Case released a compilation vinyl box set containing eight of her solo albums. The set contains her first six studio albums, including the first vinyl pressing of The Virginian, as well as a live album.

Wild Creatures
On April 19, 2022, Case released Wild Creatures, described as "digital-only, career retrospective". The album contains 22 tracks from Case's discography, plus one new song, Oh, Shadowless.

Awards and nominations
Case was honored as the Female Artist of the Year at the PLUG Independent Music Awards on February 2, 2006.

Case's album, Middle Cyclone, was nominated for Best Contemporary Folk Album and Best Recording Package (with Kathleen Judge) at the 52nd Annual Grammy Awards in 2010.

In 2014, The Worse Things Get, the Harder I Fight, the Harder I Fight, the More I Love You was nominated for Best Alternative Music Album at the 56th Annual Grammy Awards.

Notable appearances

Television
Case has appeared on Season 29 (2003–04) and 39 (2013–14) of Austin City Limits.

In 2008, Case guest starred alongside Kelly Hogan on the season 5 episode of the adult animated television series Aqua Teen Hunger Force, Sirens, in which she (as "Chrysanthemum") and Hogan (as "The B.J. Queen") take the role of sirens who have taken former Philadelphia Phillies first baseman John Kruk (as himself) captive for arcane sexual purposes.

Case also voiced the character of Cheyenne Cinnamon in Aqua Teen Hunger Force co-creator Dave Willis's Cheyenne Cinnamon and the Fantabulous Unicorn of Sugar Town Candy Fudge.

On March 3, 2010, Case appeared as a guest on the Australian music quiz show Spicks and Specks. Her team, led by Alan Brough, won 18–16. At the end of the show she sang a cover of Heart's "Magic Man", backed by Kelly Hogan and Paul Rigby.

Case appeared on Season Two of Spectacle: Elvis Costello with....

In July 2011, "I Wish I Was the Moon" was featured in the fourth season of the HBO show True Blood'''s sixth episode of the same name.

On September 3, 2013, Case appeared on Late Night with Jimmy Fallon performing "Man" and "Night Still Comes" from her album The Worse Things Get, the Harder I Fight, the Harder I Fight, the More I Love You.

On February 6, 2014, she was a panelist on the Comedy Central show @midnight.

Radio
Neko Case has appeared on NPR's weekly news quiz show, Wait Wait Don't Tell Me, as a guest on July 11, 2009 and as a panellist on September 6, 2013 and again on December 12, 2015.

On May 10, 2013, Case appeared as a guest on American Public Media's variety show Wits, where she ended the program with a rendition of Iron Maiden's "Number of the Beast".  On February 7, 2014, Case appeared again as a guest on Wits, this time alongside Andy Richter, where she finished the program with a rendition of the Bee Gees' "Nights on Broadway".

In December 2015, Case appeared on BBC Radio 4's Woman's Hour, where she talked about her career and performed her single "I'll Be Around".

Personal life
In a 2013 NPR interview, while discussing her single "Man", Case described having complicated feelings of gender and femininity: "I don't really think of myself specifically as a woman, you know? I'm kind of a critter" and "I'm probably a little imbalanced in that if you were to look at a human creature as kind of a vase or something, my glass is a little bit more full of the man stuff than the woman stuff". As of September 2021 her Twitter bio listed her pronouns as "She/Sir".

Discography
Solo
Studio albums

Live albums

Extended playsCanadian Amp (2001)

Compilation albumsWild Creatures (2022)

Non-solo
case/lang/veirscase/lang/veirs (2016)

The Corn SistersThe Other Women (CA: Mint Records, 2000)

CubBetti-Cola (CA: Mint Records, 1993)

MaowI Ruv Me Too (7-inch EP) (US: Twist Like This Records, 1995)The Unforgiving Sounds of Maow (CA: Mint Records, 1996)

The New PornographersMass Romantic (CA: Mint Records; US & EU: Matador Records, 2000)Electric Version (CA: Mint Records; US & EU: Matador Records, 2003)Twin Cinema (CA: Mint Records; US & EU: Matador Records, 2005)Challengers (CA: Last Gang Records; US & EU: Matador Records, 2007)Together (US: Matador Records, 2010)Brill Bruisers (CA: Last Gang Records; US: Matador Records, 2014)Whiteout Conditions (Concord Music Group, 2017)In the Morse Code of Brake Lights (Concord Records, 2019)

The Sadies
Make Your Bed/Gunspeak/Little Sadie (7-inch) (US: Bloodshot Records, 1998)
Car Songs My '63 / Highway 145 (by Whiskeytown) (Split 7-inch) (US: Bloodshot Records BS 037, 1998)

Other contributions
 "Christmas Card from a Hooker in Minneapolis" on New Coat of Paint: The Songs of Tom Waits (2000)
 Journey to the End of the Night by the Mekons (2000)
 "Rolling Stone" on Tribute to Robert Altman's Nashville (2002)
 "Mope-a-Long Rides Again", "Getting It Made" and "Bored Lil' Devil" on Still Lookin' Good to Me by the Band of Blacky Ranchette, (2003)
 "If I'm Gonna Sink (I Might as Well Go to the Bottom)" on Touch My Heart: a Tribute to Johnny Paycheck (SugarHill Recording Studios, 2003)
 "Knock Loud" on Fields & Streams (Kill Rock Stars compilation, 2003)
 I Want a Dog soundtrack (all vocals, 2003)
 "Buckets of Rain" on Sweetheart 2005: Love Songs (2005)
 "Hwy 5" on Forever Hasn't Happened Yet by John Doe (2005)
 "Fiery Crash" on Armchair Apocrypha by Andrew Bird (2007)
 "Yon Ferrets Return" (with Carl Newman) – Esopus 10: Good News (Esopus, CD insert, spring 2008)
 "Your Control" on Forfeit/Fortune by Crooked Fingers (2008)
 "Santa Left a Booger in My Stocking" (with Meatwad) on Have Yourself A Meaty Little Christmas (2009)
 Women and Country by Jakob Dylan (2010)
 "Silverado" on Oh Little Fire by Sarah Harmer (2010)
 "The Green Fields of Summer" on Midnight Souvenirs by Peter Wolf (2010)
 "Sing Me To Sleep" on Wreckorder by Fran Healy (2010)
 "Going Under", "Good", "Sleep", "Don't Try and Hide It" and "Companions" on No Color by the Dodos (2011)
 "She's Not There" – duet with Nick Cave, used at the end of the "She's Not There" episode of True Blood (2011)
 "Nothing to Remember", a song written and recorded for The Hunger Games: Songs from District 12 and Beyond (2012)
 "That's Who I Am" on Ghost Brothers of Darkland County, a musical by John Mellencamp, Stephen King, and T Bone Burnett (2013)
 Vocals on Desire Lines by Camera Obscura (2013)
 "Sun Song" on Warp and Weft by Laura Veirs (2013)
 "Nobody Knows You When You're Down and Out" on Boardwalk Empire Volume 2: Music from the HBO Original Series (2013)
 "These Aren't the Droids" on 2776 (2014)
 "One Voice," from the film, A Dog Named Gucci, also featuring Norah Jones,  Aimee Mann, Susanna Hoffs, Lydia Loveless, Brian May and Kathryn Calder.
 Calexico's "Tapping on the Line" on the Edge of the Sun album (2015)
 "Danny's Song" on VINYL: Music From The HBO Original Series - Vol. 1.3 (2016)

Videography
 Live from Austin TX Neko Case'' (DVD) (US: New West Records/Austin City Limits/KLRU, 2006)

See also
 List of musicians from British Columbia
 Music of Vancouver

References

External links

 
 

1970 births
21st-century American women guitarists
21st-century American guitarists
21st-century American women singers
American alternative country singers
American contraltos
American country guitarists
American country singer-songwriters
American women country singers
American women singer-songwriters
American indie rock musicians
American people of Ukrainian descent
American women rock singers
Anti- (record label) artists
Bloodshot Records artists
Emily Carr University of Art and Design alumni
Guitarists from Virginia
Guitarists from Washington (state)
Living people
Loose Music artists
Mint Records artists
Musicians from Alexandria, Virginia
Singers from Tacoma, Washington
Singer-songwriters from Virginia
Singer-songwriters from Washington (state)
The New Pornographers members
21st-century American singers